Eriogonum ovalifolium is a species of wild buckwheat known by the common name cushion buckwheat. It is native to western North America from California to Alberta, where it is a member of many plant communities in varied habitats, including the sagebrush steppe and alpine regions.

Description
In general, the species is a tough perennial herb which forms mats in gravelly soil or amongst rocks and produces erect inflorescences up to 35 centimeters in height, blooming from early to mid-summer. The flowering stems are leafless. The pale green to gray leaves at the base of the plant are rounded and woolly and have petioles.

The clumps of flowers are yellow, light red or pink, purple, or white.

Varieties
There are four to eleven varieties of this species. They include:
Eriogonum ovalifolium var. vineum, the Cushenbury buckwheat, is endemic to the San Bernardino Mountains of San Bernardino County, California. It is federally listed as an endangered species of the United States, and the main threat to its existence is mining. 
Eriogonum ovalifolium var. williamsiae, the steamboat buckwheat, is known only from the Steamboat Hills near Reno, Nevada. It is also a federally listed endangered species, and threats to it have been reduced but the populations are still quite small.

References

External links

Jepson Manual Treatment
USDA Plants Profile
The Nature Conservancy
Photo gallery

ovalifolium
Flora of the Northwestern United States
Flora of the Southwestern United States
Flora of Western Canada
Flora of California
Flora of the Rocky Mountains
Flora of the Sierra Nevada (United States)
Flora of the California desert regions